Madison Hall, formerly known as the Flagler Apartments,  is a residence hall on the campus of George Washington University (GW) in Washington, D.C.  The building was designed by Stern and Tomlinson and was built in 1926.    The building is representative of the apartment buildings that were built from the 1920s to the 1940s that have been acquired by the university and converted into dormitories.   GW bought the building in 1957 and replaced its manually operated elevators during its renovations.  The building was named for both James Madison and Dolley Madison.  It was listed on the District of Columbia Inventory of Historic Sites and the National Register of Historic Places in 2010.

See also
H.B. Burns Memorial Building
Corcoran Hall
Fulbright Hall
Jacqueline Bouvier Kennedy Onassis Hall
Munson Hall
Stockton Hall
Hattie M. Strong Residence Hall

References

Buildings and structures completed in 1926
University and college buildings on the National Register of Historic Places in Washington, D.C.
George Washington University buildings and structures
Foggy Bottom
1926 establishments in Washington, D.C.